Combretastatin A-4 is a combretastatin and a stilbenoid. It can be isolated from Combretum caffrum, the Eastern Cape South African bushwillow tree or in Combretum leprosum, the mofumbo, a species found in Brazil.

Function 
Tubulin represents a potent target in cancer chemotherapy, given its role in cell division. Combretastatin is a naturally occurring well known tubulin polymerization inhibitor. Combretastatin A-4 comes in two stereoisomers (cis (shown top right), and trans); The cis form binds much better to the 'colchicine' site on tubulin to inhibit polymerization.

Derivatives 
Combretastatin A-4 is the active component of combretastatin A-4 phosphate, a prodrug designed to damage the vasculature (blood vessels) of cancer tumors causing central necrosis.

A large number of synthetic derivatives have been reported, including beta-lactam based compounds.

See also 
 Ombrabulin, a combretastatin A-4 derivative in clinical trials for treatment of cancer

References 

Combretastatins
Stilbenoids
Experimental cancer drugs